Karin Ek, is a Swedish artist, known for her paintings of double-face gestures.
She did her master at the Royal University of fine arts in 1973–79, and she have made the decoration of Mörby Subway Station in Stockholm, Sweden.

References 

1944 births
Swedish painters
Swedish women painters
Living people